Psychotropic alkylamines are alkylamines that share the critical property of not containing an aromatic nucleus, but are still biologically active. While many of these molecules are stimulants (some of them natural), others are antiviral, have competitive NMDA antagonist activity, or are nicotinic receptor antagonists.

Alkenylamines
Isometheptene

Alkanolamines
Heptaminol

Amines